Seychelles Polytechnic is a government-owned tertiary institution located in Anse Royale, Mahé. The institution currently offer three programme areas in Business & Secretarial Studies, Visual Arts and the Manchester Twinning Programme, a first-year degree programme obtained in partnership with the University of Manchester.

History
The institution was inaugurated on 24 January 1983 by France-Albert René as a post-secondary education and training with courses initially totalling eleven. In 2005, Seychelles Institute of Technology was formed from the old Technical Programme Area and the School of Advanced Level Studies replaced the Academic Programme Area.

Notable alumni
Jean-Paul Adam (1977), former Minister for Foreign Affairs
Rolph Payet (1968), first President & Vice-Chancellor of the University of Seychelles.
Justin Valentin (1971), Minister of Education.

References

External links

Education in Seychelles
Educational organisations based in Seychelles
Educational institutions established in 1983